The follow is a list of groups formed by or for the Vietnamese-American community.

Military
Vietnamese American Armed Forces Association

Academic
Union of North American Vietnamese Student Associations
Union of Vietnamese Student Associations of Southern California

Civic and political
 Boat People SOS
 East Meets West
 Radio Free Vietnam
 Vietnamese Alliance to Combat Trafficking

Gangs
Born to Kill
Viet Boyz
Dragon Family
sT's BoYz

One of the most powerful of all the Asian gangs in California and Los Angeles taking over all Wah Chings extortion racquets in Chinatown.

See also
 Boat People
 Vietnamese American
 Overseas Vietnamese

References

External links
 Information on Vietnamese-American Gangs 
 The Dream Shattered By Peter Van Do - discusses Vietnamese Adolescent Gangs 
 The Dragon Family Gang     

Vietnamese